Moriaanshoofd is a hamlet in the Dutch province of Zeeland. It is a part of the municipality of Schouwen-Duiveland, and lies about 26 km southwest of Hellevoetsluis.

Moriaanshoofd is not a statistical entity, and the postal authorities have placed it under Kerkwerve. The hamlet consists of about 20 houses.

References

Schouwen-Duiveland
Populated places in Zeeland